This list of demolished buildings and structures in London includes buildings, structures and urban scenes of particular architectural and historical interest, scenic buildings which are preserved in old photographs, prints and paintings, but which have been demolished or were destroyed by bombing in World War II.  Only a small number of the most notable buildings are listed out of the many thousands which have been demolished.

Buildings

See also
 Metropolitan Board of Works
 Gaiety Theatre, London
 List of demolished churches in the City of London
 List of public art formerly in London

References

 
Dem